Xanthotaenia is a monotypic butterfly genus in the family Nymphalidae. Its single species is Xanthotaenia busiris, the yellow-banded nymph. They can be identified by a yellow strip along their forewings.

Behavior
The larvae feed on Calamus, while adults spend most of their lives at ground level usually near ginger, around Faunis canens butterflies. It is semi-crepuscular in behavior.

Distribution
The Xanthotaenia are primarily found around Myanmar, Thailand, Malaysia, Sumatra and Borneo, in tropical rainforests at elevations between 100–300 m.

Subspecies
Xanthotaenia busiris busiris (southern Burma: Teanasserim, Thailand, Peninsular Malaya, Sumatra)
Xanthotaenia busiris burra Stichel, 1906 (Borneo, Natuna Islands)
Xanthotaenia busiris obscura Butler, 1883 (Nias)
Xanthotaenia busiris polychroma Hagen, 1898 (Mentawai)

References

External links 

 Learn About Butterflies

Amathusiini
Butterflies of Borneo
Butterflies of Indonesia
Butterflies of Indochina
Monotypic butterfly genera
Taxa named by John O. Westwood
Nymphalidae genera